Valeriy Olehovych Rohozynskyi (born 3 September 1995) is a Ukrainian professional footballer who plays as a left midfielder for Ukrainian club Alians Lypova Dolyna.

References

External links
 Profile on Alians Lypova Dolyna official website
 
 

1995 births
Living people
Sportspeople from Mykolaiv
Ukrainian footballers
Association football midfielders
MFC Mykolaiv-2 players
MFC Mykolaiv players
FC Poltava players
FC Alians Lypova Dolyna players
Ukrainian First League players